The 2009 South American Youth Championship (Sudamericano sub-20) was a football competition for national teams U-20 who are associated with the football federation CONMEBOL. It was the 24th time the tournament was held and took place in Venezuela from January 19 to February 8. It also served as qualification for the 2009 FIFA U-20 World Cup. Brazil won the tournament, becoming champions for the tenth time.

The tournament was initially hosted in Peru, however following FIFA sanctions over Peruvian Government's investigation of the FPF's corruption, it was moved to Venezuela.

Teams

 (host)

Squads

First Group Stage

Group A

(*) Colombia qualified to the following round after winning a coin toss

Match schedule

Group B

Match schedule

Final Group

Winners

Goal scorers

5 goals
 Walter
 Robin Ramírez
 Hernán Pérez
 Abel Hernández

4 goals
 Eduardo Salvio
 Federico Santander

3 goals
 Douglas Costa
 Mauricio Gómez
 Hernán Pertúz
 Nicolás Lodeiro
 Jonathan Urretavizcaya
 Santiago García
 Salomón Rondón

2 goals
 Jonathan Cristaldo
 Alan Kardec
 Giuliano
 Maylson
 Marco Perez
 Joao Rojas
 Aldo Andrés Paniagua
 Juan José Barros
 Yonathan Del Valle

1 goal
 Leandro Velázquez
 Marcelo Benítez
 Cristian Gaitán
 Iván Bella
 Jehanamed Castedo
 Nicolás Darío Tudor
 Tales
 Dentinho
 Sandro
 Boris Sagredo
 Charles Aránguiz
 Yamith Cuesta
 Cristian Nazarith
 Elkin Blanco
 Sherman Cárdenas
 Juan Luis Anangonó
 Jefferson Pinto
 Gustavo Cristaldo
 Celso Ortiz
 Luis Trujillo
 Tabaré Viudez
 Alejandro Peña
 Leandro Cabrera
 Marcelo Andrés Silva
 Maximiliano Córdoba
 Matías Aguirregaray

1 goal cont.
 Jonathan Charquero
 Louis Ángelo Peña
 Carlos Enrique Fernández
 Pablo Camacho
 José Manuel Velázquez
 Rafael Acosta

own goals
 Alejandro Peña (from Venezuela)

Qualified for the 2009 FIFA U-20 World Cup

 Brazil 
 Paraguay 
 Uruguay 
 Venezuela

See also

2009 FIFA U-20 World Cup
2009 South American Under 17 Football Championship

2009
2009
Under
2008–09 in Venezuelan football
2009 in youth association football